The Men's Javelin Throw at the 2009 World Championships in Athletics was held at the Olympic Stadium in Berlin, Germany on August 21 and August 23. The second qualification group was interrupted for one hour, after the 2nd throw, due to heavy rain.

Medalists

Schedule
All times are Central European Time (UTC+1)

Qualification standards

Abbreviations
All results shown are in metres

Records

Results

Qualification
Qualification: Qualifying Performance 82.00 (Q) or at least 12 best performers (q) advance to the final.

Final

References
General

Specific

Javelin throw
Javelin throw at the World Athletics Championships